Spinal stenosis is an abnormal narrowing of the spinal canal or neural foramen that results in pressure on the spinal cord or nerve roots. Symptoms may include pain, numbness, or weakness in the arms or legs. Symptoms are typically gradual in onset and improve with leaning forward. Severe symptoms may include loss of bladder control, loss of bowel control, or sexual dysfunction.

Causes may include osteoarthritis, rheumatoid arthritis, spinal tumors, trauma, Paget's disease of the bone, scoliosis, spondylolisthesis, and the genetic condition achondroplasia. It can be classified by the part of the spine affected into cervical, thoracic, and lumbar stenosis. Lumbar stenosis is the most common, followed by cervical stenosis. Diagnosis is generally based on symptoms and medical imaging.

Treatment may involve medications, bracing, or surgery. Medications may include NSAIDs, acetaminophen, anticonvulsants (gabapentinoids) or steroid injections. Stretching and strengthening exercises may also be useful. Limiting certain activities may be recommended. Surgery is typically only done if other treatments are not effective, with the usual procedure being a decompressive laminectomy.

Spinal stenosis occurs in as many as 8% of people. It occurs most commonly in people over the age of 50. Males and females are affected equally often. The first modern description of the condition is from 1803 by Antoine Portal, and there is evidence of the condition dating back to Ancient Egypt.

Types 
The most common forms are lumbar spinal stenosis, at the level of the lower back, and cervical spinal stenosis, which are at the level of the neck. Thoracic spinal stenosis, at the level of the mid-back, is much less common.

In lumbar stenosis, the spinal nerve roots in the lower back are compressed which can lead to symptoms of sciatica (tingling, weakness, or numbness that radiates from the low back and into the buttocks and legs).

Cervical spinal stenosis can be far more dangerous by compressing the spinal cord. Cervical canal stenosis may lead to myelopathy, a serious condition causing symptoms including major body weakness and paralysis. Such severe spinal stenosis symptoms are virtually absent in  lumbar stenosis, however, as the spinal cord terminates at the top end of the adult lumbar spine, with only nerve roots (cauda equina) continuing further down. Cervical spinal stenosis is a condition involving narrowing of the spinal canal at the level of the neck. It is frequently due to chronic degeneration, but may also be congenital or traumatic. Treatment frequently is surgical.

Signs and symptoms

Common
 Standing discomfort (94%)
 Discomfort/pain, in shoulder, arm, hand (78%)
 Bilateral symptoms (68%)
 Numbness at or below the level of involvement  (63%)
 Weakness at or below the level of involvement  (43%)
 Pain or weakness in buttock / thigh only (8%)
 Pain or weakness below the knee (3%)

Neurological disorders
 Cervical (spondylotic) myelopathy, a syndrome caused by compression of the cervical spinal cord which is associated with "numb and clumsy hands", imbalance,   loss of bladder and bowel control, and weakness that can progress to paralysis.
 Pinched nerve, causing numbness.
 Intermittent neurogenic claudication characterized by lower limb numbness, weakness, diffuse or radicular leg pain associated with paresthesia (bilaterally), weakness and/or heaviness in buttocks radiating into lower extremities with walking or prolonged standing. Symptoms occur with extension of spine and are relieved with spine flexion. Minimal to zero symptoms when seated or supine. 

 Radiculopathy (with or without radicular pain) neurologic condition—nerve root dysfunction causes objective signs such as weakness, loss of sensation and of reflex.
 Cauda equina syndrome - Lower extremity pain, weakness, numbness that may involve perineum and buttocks, associated with bladder and bowel dysfunction.
 Lower back pain due to degenerative disc or joint changes.

Causes

Aging
Any of the factors below may cause the spaces in the spine to narrow.
 Spinal ligaments can thicken (ligamenta flava)
 Bone spurs develop on the bone and into the spinal canal or foraminal openings
 Intervertebral discs may bulge or herniate into the canal or foraminal openings
 Degenerative disc disease causes narrowing of the spaces.
 Facet joints break down
 Facet joints may hypertrophy
 Compression fractures of the spine, which are common in osteoporosis
 Synovial cysts form on the facet joints causing compression of the spinal sac of nerves (thecal sac)

Arthritis
 Osteoarthritis
 Rheumatoid arthritis—much less common cause of spinal problems

Congenital
 Spinal canal is too small at birth
 Structural deformities of the vertebrae may cause narrowing of the spinal canal.

Instability of the spine
 A vertebra slips forward on another (spondylolisthesis)

Trauma
 Accidents and injuries may dislocate the spine and the spinal canal or cause burst fractures that yield fragments of bone that go through the canal.
 Patients with cervical myelopathy caused by narrowing of the spinal canal are at higher risks of acute spinal cord injury if involved in accidents.

Tumors
 Irregular growths of soft tissue will cause inflammation.
 Growth of tissue into the canal pressing on nerves, the sac of nerves, or the spinal cord.

Diagnosis

The diagnosis of spinal stenosis involves a complete evaluation of the spine. The process usually begins with a medical history and physical examination. X-ray and MRI scans are typically used to determine the extent and location of the nerve compression.

Medical history
The medical history is the most important aspect of the examination as it will tell the physician about subjective symptoms, possible causes for spinal stenosis, and other possible causes of back pain.

Physical examination
The physical examination of a patient with spinal stenosis will give the physician information about exactly where nerve compression is occurring. Some important factors that should be investigated are any areas of sensory abnormalities, numbness, irregular reflexes, and any muscular weakness.

MRI
MRI has become the most frequently used study to diagnose spinal stenosis. The MRI uses electromagnetic signals to produce images of the spine. MRIs are helpful because they show more structures, including nerves, muscles, and ligaments, than seen on X-rays or CT scans. MRIs are helpful at showing exactly what is causing spinal nerve compression.

Myelography

In CT myelography, spinal tap is performed in the low back with dye injected into the spinal fluid. X-rays are performed followed by a CT scan of the spine to help see narrowing of the spinal canal.
This is a very effective study in cases of lateral recess stenosis.  It is also necessary for patients in which MRI is contraindicated, such as those with implanted pacemakers.

Red flags
 Fever
 Nocturnal pain
 Gait disturbance
 Structural deformity
 Unexplained weight loss
 Previous carcinoma
 Severe pain upon lying down
 Recent trauma with suspicious fracture
 Presence of severe or progressive neurologic deficit

Treatments
Treatment options are either surgical or non-surgical. Overall evidence is inconclusive whether non-surgical or surgical treatment is the better for lumbar spinal stenosis.

Non-surgical treatments
The effectiveness of non-surgical treatments is unclear as they have not been well studied.
 Education about the course of the condition and how to relieve symptoms
 Medicines to relieve pain and inflammation, such as acetaminophen, nonsteroidal anti-inflammatory drugs (NSAIDs)
 Exercise, to maintain or achieve overall good health, aerobic exercise, such as riding a stationary bicycle, which allows for a forward lean, walking, or swimming can relieve symptoms
 Weight loss, to relieve symptoms and slow progression of the stenosis
 Physical therapy to support self-care. Also may give instructs on stretching and strength exercises that may lead to a decrease in pain and other symptoms.
 Lumbar epidural steroid or anesthetic injections have low quality evidence to support their use.

Surgery
Lumbar decompressive laminectomy: This involves removing the roof of bone overlying the spinal canal and thickened ligaments in order to decompress the nerves and sac of nerves. 70-90% of people have good results.
 Interlaminar implant:  This is a non-fusion U-shaped device that is placed between two bones in the lower back that maintains motion in the spine and keeps the spine stable after a lumbar decompressive surgery. The U-shaped device maintains height between the bones in the spine so nerves can exit freely and extend to lower extremities.
 Surgery for cervical myelopathy is either conducted from the front or from the back, depending on several factors such as where the compression occurs and how the cervical spine is aligned.
 Anterior cervical discectomy and fusion: A surgical treatment of nerve root or spinal cord compression by decompressing the spinal cord and nerve roots of the cervical spine with a discectomy in order to stabilize the corresponding vertebrae.
 Posterior approaches seek to generate space around the spinal cord by removing parts of the posterior elements of the spine. Techniques include laminectomy, laminectomy and fusion, and laminoplasty.

Decompression plus fusion appears no better than decompression alone, while spinal spacers appears better than decompression plus fusion but not better than decompression alone. No differences were found in the type of decompression.

Epidemiology
 The NAMCS data shows the incidence in the U.S. population to be 3.9% of 29,964,894 visits for mechanical back problems.
 It occurs more frequently in women.

Prognosis
In a study of 146 patients with lumbar spinal stenosis (mean age, 68 years, 42% women) who did not undergo surgery, followed up for 3 years, the study reported that approximately one-third of participants indicated improvement; approximately 50% reported no change in symptoms; and approximately 10% to 20% of patients condition worsened.

Research
A RCT is being conducted in Sweden, to compare surgery versus non-surgical treatment for lumbar spinal stenosis.

See also
 Spinal cord compression

References

External links 
  
 

Geriatrics
Spinal cord disorders
Vertebral column disorders
Wikipedia medicine articles ready to translate